Billah is an Arabic phrase meaning with God or through God. It is used in various standard sayings, such as the Hawqala and the Ta'awwudh. It is also often used as a component of compound personal proper names, particularly as regnal names by caliphs and other rulers when it might be seen as a counterpart of the Christian usage by the grace of God. It is used for example as follows:

Al-Aziz Billah, mighty through God
Al-Aziz Billah (955–996), fifth Fatimid Caliph
Baqi Billah, everlasting through God
Khwaja Baqi Billah (1563–1603), Sufi saint from Kabul
Al-Mahdi Billah, rightly guided through God
Al-Mahdi Billah (744 or 745 – 785), third Abbasid Caliph of Baghdad
Abd Allah al-Mahdi Billah (873–934), founder of the Fatimid dynasty
Muhammad II al-Mahdi Billah (976–1010), fourth Umayyad Caliph of Córdoba
Al-Mansur Billah, he who is victorious through God
one of the names of Muhammad al-Badr (1926–1996), King and Imam of Yemen
Al-Muhtadi Billah, rightly guided through God
Al-Muhtadi Billah (died 870), fourteenth Abbasid Caliph of Baghdad
Al-Muhtadee Billah (born 1974), heir to the Sultan of Brunei
Al-Muktafi Billah, contented with God alone
Al-Muktafi Billah (877/78 – 908), seventeenth Abbasid Caliph of Baghdad
one of the names of Mahmud of Terengganu (1930–1998), Sultan of Terengganu, Malaysia
Al-Muntasir Billah, he who triumphs in God
Al-Muntasir Billah (837–862), eleventh Abbasid Caliph of Baghdad
Al-Mustafa Billah, one who is chosen through God
one of the names of Abdullah of Pahang (born 1959), Yang di-Pertuan Agong of Malaysia
Al-Musta'in Billah, one who asks for help through God
Al-Musta'in Billah (836–866), twelfth Abbasid Caliph of Baghdad
Sulayman al-Musta'in Billah (965–1016), fifth Umayyad Caliph of Córdoba
Al-Musta'in Billah (1390–1430), tenth Abbasid Caliph of Cairo.
one of the names of Ahmad Shah of Pahang (1930–2019), Sultan of Pahang, Malaysia
Al-Mustakfi Billah, desirous of being satisfied with God alone
Al-Mustakfi Billah (905–949), twenty-second Abbasid Caliph of Baghdad
Muhammad III al-Mustakfi Billah (976–1025), tenth Umayyad Caliph of Córdoba
Al-Mustakfi Billah I (1285–1340), third Abbasid Caliph of Cairo
Al-Mustakfi Billah II (1388–1451), twelfth Abbasid Caliph of Cairo
Al-Musta'li Billah, exalted through God
Al-Musta'li Billah (1074–1101), ninth Fatimid Caliph
Al-Mustamsik Billah, one who restrains himself through God
Al-Mustamsik Billah (died 1521), sixteenth Abbasid Caliph of Cairo
Al-Mustanjid Billah, one who implores for help through God
Al-Mustanjid Billah (1124–1170), thirty-second Abbasid Caliph of Baghdad
Al-Mustanjid Billah (died 1479), fourteenth Abbasid Caliph of Cairo
Al-Mustansir Billah, one who asks for victory through God
Al-Hakam II al-Mustansir Billah (915–976), first Umayyad Caliph of Córdoba
Al-Mustansir Billah  (1029–1094), eighth Fatimid Caliph
Al-Mustansir Billah (1192–1242), thirty-sixth Abbasid Caliph of Baghdad
Al-Mustansir Billah (died 1261), first Abbasid Caliph of Cairo
Al-Mustarshid Billah, one who seeks direction through God
Al-Mustarshid Billah (1092–1135), twenty-ninth Abbasid Caliph of Baghdad
Al-Musta'sim Billah, he who holds fast through God
Al-Musta'sim Billah (1213–1258), last Abbasid Caliph of Baghdad
Al-Musta'sim Billah (died 1389), eighth Abbasid Caliph of Cairo
Al-Mustazhir Billah, one who knows by heart through God
Abd al-Rahman V al-Mustazhir Billah (1001–1024), ninth Umayyad Caliph of Córdoba
Al-Mustazhir Billah (1078–1118), twenty-eighth Abbasid Caliph of Baghdad
Al-Mu'tadid Billah, seeking support in God
Al-Mu'tadid Billah (853/4 or 860/1 – 902), sixteenth Abbasid Caliph of Baghdad
Al-Mu'tadid Billah I (died 1362), sixth Abbasid Caliph of Cairo
Al-Mu'tadid Billah II (died 1441), eleventh Abbasid Caliph of Cairo
Al-Mu'tasim Billah, abstaining from sin through God
Al-Mu'tasim Billah (796–842), eighth Abbasid Caliph of Baghdad
one of the names of Abdullah al-Mutassim Billah Shah of Pahang (1874–1932), Sultan of Pahang, Malaysia
one of the names of Abdul Aziz al-Mutasim Billah Shah of Perak (1887–1948), Sultan of Perak, Malaysia
one of the names of Abdul Halim of Kedah (1927–2017), Sultan of Kedah, Malaysia
Proper given name of Mutassim Gaddafi, son of Libyan leader Muammar Gaddafi
Motasim Billah Mazhabi (born 1964), Afghan politician
Qazi Mu'tasim Billah (1933–2013), Bangladeshi Islamic scholar and teacher
Al-Mu'tazz Billah, he who is strengthened by God
Al-Mu'tazz Billah (847–869), thirteenth Abbasid Caliph of Baghdad
Al-Muqtadir Billah, mighty through God
Al-Muqtadir Billah (895–932), eighteenth Abbasid Caliph of Baghdad
Al-Qadir Billah, powerful through God
Al-Qadir Billah (947–1031), twenty-fifth Abbasid Caliph of Baghdad
Al-Qahir Billah, victorious through God
Al-Qahir Billah (899–950), nineteenth Abbasid Caliph of Baghdad
Al-Radi Billah, content with God
Al-Radi Billah (909–940), twentieth Abbasid Caliph of Baghdad
Al-Rashid Billah, rightly guided through God
Al-Rashid Billah (1109–1138), thirtieth Abbasid Caliph of Baghdad
Al-Wathiq Billah, he who holds trust through God
Al-Wathiq Billah (812–847), ninth Abbasid Caliph of Baghdad
Al-Wathiq Billah I (died 1341), fourth Abbasid Caliph of Cairo
Al-Wathiq Billah II (died 1386), ninth Abbasid Caliph of Cairo
one of the names of Taimur bin Feisal (1886–1965), Sultan of Oman
one of the names of Mizan Zainal Abidin of Terengganu (born 1962), Sultan of Terengganu, Malaysia

References

Arabic masculine given names